Kar (Kler), or Eastern Karaboro, is a central Senufo language of Burkina Faso. Kar speakers have moderate comprehension of Western Karaboro, but the reverse is not the case.

References

External links
(French) Description grammaticale du kar : langue senoufo du Burkina Faso.

Karaboro languages
Languages of Ivory Coast